Wang Hao (born 25 October 1962) is a Chinese former swimmer who competed in the 1984 Summer Olympics.

References

1962 births
Living people
Chinese male backstroke swimmers
Olympic swimmers of China
Swimmers at the 1984 Summer Olympics
Asian Games medalists in swimming
Swimmers at the 1986 Asian Games
Asian Games silver medalists for China
Asian Games bronze medalists for China
Medalists at the 1986 Asian Games
20th-century Chinese people